Sérénac is a commune in the Tarn department, southern France.

See also
Communes of the Tarn department

References

Communes of Tarn (department)